Tarnówek  is a village in the administrative district of Gmina Witnica, within Gorzów County, Lubusz Voivodeship, in western Poland.

The village has a population of 10.

References

Villages in Gorzów County